Jöns-Ove "Jojje" Jönsson (born June 30, 1955, in Varberg, Halland, Sweden) is a Swedish actor and playwright.

Jojje won a Golden Mask for best male supporting actor in a play 2000 and 2001. He is most widely known for his roles in the farces of Stefan & Krister, from the 1990s and onwards. He had however had some earlier success playing Ivan Boring in the 1980s.

Acting roles 
 2006 - Brännvin och fågelholkar – Söderkåkar reser västerut!
 2005 - Två ägg i högklackat
 2004 - Två bröder emellan
 2003 - Barnaskrik och jäkelskap
 2002 - Bröllop och jäkelskap
 2001 - Snålvatten och jäkelskap
 2000 - Rena rama rolf
 1999 - Bröstsim & gubbsjuka
 1998 - Där fick du!
 1998 - Full frys
 1997 - Hemvärn & påssjuka
 1996 - Hemlighuset
 1993 - Full fräs med Stefan & Krister

Playwright 
 1993 - Full fräs med Stefan & Krister

References

External links 

1955 births
Living people
Swedish male actors
20th-century Swedish people